Beyond Mombasa is a 1956 British/American Technicolor adventure film starring  Cornel Wilde and Donna Reed. It was directed by George Marshall, set in Kenya and filmed there and at a London studio.

Plot
Matt Campbell (Cornel Wilde) arrives in Kenya, where his brother George is reported missing. A man named Ralph Hoyt (Leo Genn) tells him that George has been killed by members of the "Leopard Men" cult.

Matt is introduced to Hoyt's niece, Ann Wilson (Donna Reed), an anthropologist, who is puzzled by Matt's reluctance to go to Mombasa for his brother's funeral. Matt also meets big-game hunter Gil Rossi (Christopher Lee), who was helping George search for a valuable uranium mine. Hoyt claims the mine doesn't exist.

Another business partner, Elliott Hastings (Ron Randell), claims that George's body has been cremated but he did find a map. An expedition beyond Mombasa is formed, guided by Ketimi (Dan Jackson) and other local tribesmen. A shared experience with a charge of hippos brings Matt and Ann closer together, while Gil is nearly killed by a crocodile before it is shot by Hastings.

Tribesmen wearing leopard disguises attack Hastings that night. Ketimi is then killed by a poison dart, causing the other tribesmen to leave. Locating a shaft to the mine, Elliot, Matt and Ann descend into it. She discovers to her horror that Hoyt, her uncle, has murdered Gil with a blow gun. Hoyt confesses to killing Ketimi and paying other natives to disguise themselves as the mythical Leopard Men.

Matt and Ann are about to become the next victims, but Ketimi's fellow tribesmen reappear and take their revenge.

Cast
 Cornel Wilde as Matt Campbell
 Donna Reed as Ann Wilson
 Leo Genn as Ralph Hoyt
 Ron Randell as Elliot Hastings
 Christopher Lee as Gil Rossi
 Dan Jackson as Ketimi

Production

Development
The film was made by Hemisphere, an off shoot of Columbia under the supervision of Mike Frankovich which shot films outside the US. They co produced with Todon, the production company of agent-turned producer Tony Owens and his wife, actor Donna Reed.

It was originally named Mark of the Leopard. It was then known as Mombasa and Black Mamba.

The film was to star Aldo Ray but he turned down the role. As a result Columbia put him on suspension. Cornel Wilde replaced him in December 1955. Leo Genn signed to do the film after pulling out of Run for the Sun. A key support role went to Ron Randell.

Shooting
Filming took place in the studio in London and on location in Africa. It was to have begun in July 1955. Filming didn't start until February 1956.

After the film was completed, Owen said all of his films "stink - but they made money." However he said Beyond Mombasa "is the first one I've done that isn't lousy - and I'm worried."

See also
 List of American films of 1956

References

External links
 
 
 
 
Review of film at Variety

1956 films
Films directed by George Marshall
Columbia Pictures films
Films based on British novels
1956 adventure films
Films scored by Humphrey Searle
Films set in Kenya
Films shot in Kenya
Films about mining
British adventure films
1950s English-language films
1950s British films